Gregory III may refer to:

 Pope Gregory III, in office 731–741
 Gregory III, Count of Tusculum, r. 1058–1108
 Grigor III Pahlavuni, Armenian Catholicos of Cilicia in 1113–1166
 Gregory III Šubić of Bribir, died in 1342 or 1356, Croatian noble 
 Patriarch Gregory III of Alexandria, Greek Orthodox patriarch, in office 1354–1366
 Patriarch Gregory III of Constantinople, in office 1443–1450
 Gregory III Laham, Patriarch of the Melkite Greek Catholic Church from 2000